Lawrence "Lol" Solman (May 14, 1863 – March 24, 1931) was a prominent businessman in Toronto, Ontario, Canada.

Biography
Born in Toronto, Solman was educated in public schools. After attending the Mechanic's Institute, he began business in a mail-order operation in Detroit; operated a restaurant at Hanlan's Point; married Emily Hanlan in 1893, sister of noted rower Ned Hanlan and helped him advance in his business career; established Toronto Ferry Company, which held a monopoly on traffic to the Toronto Islands; owner of the Toronto Maple Leafs baseball club; co-founder of the Tecumseh Lacrosse Club; managing director of the Royal Alexandra Theatre, Sunnyside Amusement Park, Hanlan's Hotel, the Hanlan's Point Amusement Park and Arena Gardens in Toronto; vice-president of Loews Canadian theatres.

Solman is buried at Mount Pleasant Cemetery, Toronto, while his wife, Emily Durnan Hanlan Solman, is buried at the Hanlan plot at Toronto Necropolis cemetery.

Gallery

Sources
 Bossin, Hy. "Stars of David: Toronto, 1856-1965". Canadian Jewish Congress, 1957
 "Lawrence Solman is dead following long illness," Toronto Star, March 24, 1931, p. 1.

References

1863 births
1931 deaths
Canadian Jews
Toronto Maple Leafs (International League)
Businesspeople from Detroit
People from Old Toronto